Royal Air Force Methwold or more simply RAF Methwold is a Royal Air Force station located  north east of Feltwell, Norfolk and  north west of Thetford, Norfolk, England.

History

RAF Methwold opened as a dispersal airfield for RAF Feltwell in the Winter of 1938. Vickers Wellington bombers from Feltwell continued to use the site as a satellite base until the grass airfield was transferred to No. 2 Group in the exchange of bases with No. 3 Group, in the summer of 1942. Several asphalt hardstandings were put down for aircraft during 1940–1941.

In August 1943, the airfield was closed to flying while it was upgraded to A standard.  Three concrete runways were built, the main aligned on 06-24 (2,000 yards), 11-29 (1,600 yards) and 17-35 (1,500 yards). 36 hardstandings were built, 35 of the loop type and a single pan. The original asphalt pans were not retained.

Following this work, RAF Methwold was a higher standard base than its parent at Feltwell.  The airfield was returned to No. 3 Group and became a sub-station of RAF Mildenhall.

43 aircraft either failed to return or crashed during the operations from RAF Methwold; 25 Venturas, 6 Stirlings, and 12 Lancasters.

Methwold aircraft

Several types of aircraft have operated out of Methwold, among these:
Vickers Wellington
Lockheed Ventura
Short Stirling
Avro Lancaster
Airspeed Horsa
North American Harvard

Based units
 No. 57 Squadron RAF
 No. 214 Squadron RAF
 No. 21 Squadron RAF
 No. 464 Squadron RAAF
 No. 487 Squadron RNZAF
 No. 149 Squadron RAF
 No. 218 Squadron RAF
 No. 207 Squadron RAF
 No. 320 (Netherlands) Squadron RAF
 No. 3 Flying Training School RAF
 No. 3 Service Flying Training School RAF
 No. 21 Heavy Glider Maintenance Section

Current use

After closure as an operational airfield in April 1946, the airfield remained under care and maintenance until it was finally sold in the 1960s.  Today the majority of the site has been returned to agriculture, with two hangars remaining in use as agricultural grain stores and two others used for packaging Quorn and Cauldron products (Marlow Foods) for sale in supermarkets.
To the southern edge of the site a well-preserved battle headquarters and some gunpits along with a number of air raid shelters may be found.

See also
Norfolk Airfields
List of former Royal Air Force stations

References

External links
 RAF History – Bomber Command 60th Anniversary
 Methwold History Group Local History Group with an interest in "All Things Methwold" Publishers of a booklet on RAF Methwold

Royal Air Force stations in Norfolk
Royal Air Force stations of World War II in the United Kingdom